Ariranha is a municipality in the state of São Paulo, Brazil. The population is 9,761 (2020 est.) in an area of 132.6 km².
Ariranha belongs to the Mesoregion of São José do Rio Preto.

References

Municipalities in São Paulo (state)